Goin' to Kansas City Blues is an album by vocalist Jimmy Witherspoon with pianist Jay McShann and His Band that was recorded in 1957 and released by the RCA Victor label.

Reception

Richie Unterberger of AllMusic stated, "A reunion of sorts with McShann, with whom Witherspoon had sung for four years in the late '40s. A relaxed, swinging set that bisects jazz and blues, it holds no great surprises, but 'Spoon fans will find this an enjoyable and accomplished record".

Track listing
 "The Jumpin' Blues" (Jay McShann, Charlie Parker) – 3:03
 "Until the Real Thing Comes Along" (Sammy Cahn, Saul Chaplin, L.E. Freeman, Mann Holiner, Alberta Nichols) – 2:47
 "Hootie Blues" (McShann, Parker) – 3:20
 "Rain Is Such a Lonesome Sound" (Jimmy Witherspoon) – 3:16
 "Confessin' the Blues" (McShann, Walter Brown) – 4:15
 "Piney Brown Blues" (Pete Johnson, Big Joe Turner) – 5:29
 "Froggy Bottom" (John T. Williams) – 2:36
 "Gee, Baby, Ain't I Good to You" (Don Redman, Andy Razaf) – 3:17	
 "Blue Monday" (Witherspoon) – 3:40
 "Ooh Wee, Then the Lights Go Out" (Willie Dixon) – 2:55
 "Cloudy" (Mary Lou Williams) – 3:14 Additional track on CD reissue
 "Fare Thee Honey, Fare Thee Well" (J. Mayo Williams, John Akers) – 3:30 Additional track on CD reissue
 "Ride On" (Skeets Tolbert) – 3:30 Additional track on CD reissue

Personnel
Jimmy Witherspoon – vocals
Jay McShann – piano
Emmett Berry (tracks 2, 4, 7, 8 & 10–13), Ray Copeland (tracks 1, 3, 5, 6 & 9) – trumpet
J. C. Higginbotham – trombone
Hilton Jefferson – alto saxophone
Seldon Powell – tenor saxophone
Haywood Henry (tracks 1, 3, 5, 6 & 9), Al Sears (tracks 2, 4, 7, 8 & 10–13) – baritone saxophone
Kenny Burrell – guitar
Gene Ramey – bass
Mousey Alexander – drums
Budd Johnson – arranger

References

Jimmy Witherspoon albums
Jay McShann albums
1958 albums
RCA Victor albums